Luke Rowe (born 10 March 1990) is a Welsh racing cyclist, who rides for UCI WorldTeam .

Biography
Born in Cardiff, Rowe began racing at a young age, initially riding with his parents on a tandem. He began to enjoy cycling and became a member of the Maindy Flyers, based at Maindy Centre. As a junior, he was a member of British Cycling's Olympic Development Programme, His father, Courtney Rowe, coaches the Paralympian Simon Richardson, while his brother Matthew Rowe and his sister-in-law Dani Rowe also competed professionally.

Track career
Rowe made his European debut as a member of the team pursuit squad who took the gold medal at the 2007 UEC European Track Championships. He finished second in the 2008 European Road Race Championships, and won the Madison, along with Mark Christian, and the silver in the team pursuit at the 2008 European Track Championships.

Team Sky (2012–)

Rowe joined  for the 2012 season as a neo-pro, having signed a two-year deal. He took his first professional victory in September 2012 by winning the opening stage of the Tour of Britain. Rowe made his Grand Tour debut at the 2013 Vuelta a España.

Rowe represented Wales at the Commonwealth Games in Glasgow, 2014, and finished sixth in the road race, which was won by teammate Geraint Thomas. Rowe rode the 2014 Vuelta a España, and helped Chris Froome to finish second overall.

Rowe enjoyed a strong start to the 2015 season with fourth place at the Cadel Evans Great Ocean Road Race and seventh overall at the Tour of Qatar. Rowe then had a breakthrough classics campaign, placing ninth in Omloop Het Nieuwsblad (which was won by teammate Ian Stannard, thirteenth in E3 Harelbeke (won by teammate Geraint Thomas) and an impressive eighth in Paris–Roubaix, ahead of Bradley Wiggins (18th) who was riding his final race for Sky. He was selected in Sky's team for the Tour de France, becoming the third Welsh rider to compete in the Tour after Colin Lewis and Geraint Thomas.

By finishing in 167th place in the 2017 Tour de France, Rowe earned the unofficial "lanterne rouge", a recognition reserved for the last rider to finish. In August 2017, Rowe fractured the tibia and fibula in his right leg, when he jumped into shallow water while whitewater rafting at his brother's stag party in Prague. Having feared he would be unlikely to race for up to a year, Rowe returned to racing earlier than expected, in late February at the 2018 Abu Dhabi Tour, having originally planned to return for the Commonwealth Games.

Major results

2007
 1st  Team pursuit, UEC European Junior Track Championships
 1st  Madison (with Adam Blythe), National Track Championships
 1st  Points classification, Junior Tour of Wales
2008
 UEC European Junior Track Championships
1st  Madison (with Mark Christian)
2nd  Team pursuit
 1st  Derny, National Track Championships
 2nd  Road race, UEC European Junior Road Championships
2009
 1st ZLM Tour
 2nd Madison (with Geraint Thomas), National Track Championships
 6th Coppa Colli Briantei Internazionale
2010
 1st  Madison (with Mark Christian), National Track Championships
 1st Gran Premio di Poggiana
 3rd Gran Premio Industrie del Marmo
 4th Gran Premio Palio del Recioto
 5th Ronde Van Vlaanderen Beloften
 6th Overall Tour de Berlin
 8th Trofeo Franco Balestra Memorial Metelli
 9th Road race, Commonwealth Games
2011
 1st  Madison (with Peter Kennaugh), National Track Championships
 1st ZLM Tour
 1st Stage 7 Thüringen Rundfahrt der U23
 5th Overall Tour de Normandie
 8th La Côte Picarde
 9th Overall Olympia's Tour
2012
 1st Stage 1 Tour of Britain
 Revolution Series, Round 3, Manchester
1st Australian pursuit
1st Scratch
 2nd Duo Normand (with Alex Dowsett)
2013
 National Road Championships
5th Road race
5th Time trial
 9th Overall Tour of Qatar
2014
 National Road Championships
4th Road race
4th Time trial
 6th Road race, Commonwealth Games
2015
 1st Stage 1 (TTT) Tour de Romandie
 4th Road race, National Road Championships
 4th Cadel Evans Great Ocean Road Race
 7th Overall Tour of Qatar
 8th Paris–Roubaix
 9th Omloop Het Nieuwsblad
2016
 4th Omloop Het Nieuwsblad
 5th Tour of Flanders
2017
 1st Stage 2 Herald Sun Tour
 3rd Kuurne–Brussels–Kuurne
 5th Cadel Evans Great Ocean Road Race
 6th Omloop Het Nieuwsblad
2018
 1st Stage 3 (TTT) Critérium du Dauphiné
 1st Stage 1b (TTT) Settimana Internazionale di Coppi e Bartali
2019
 6th Dwars door Vlaanderen
 6th Cadel Evans Great Ocean Road Race

Grand Tour general classification results timeline

Classics results timeline

References

External links

 
 Luke Rowe profile at Team Sky
 
 
 

1990 births
Living people
British male cyclists
Welsh male cyclists
Sportspeople from Cardiff
Cyclists at the 2010 Commonwealth Games
Cyclists at the 2014 Commonwealth Games
Commonwealth Games competitors for Wales